Shiloh (Hebrew: šīlō  or šīlōh ) is a figure mentioned in the Hebrew Bible in Genesis 49:10 as part of the benediction given by Jacob to his son Judah. Jacob states that "the sceptre will not depart from Judah... until Shiloh comes...".

Versions and translations
The Latin Vulgate translates the word as "he ... that is to be sent" (Latin: donec veniate qui mittendum est), which would be the equivalent of the Hebrew shaluach ("messenger"), indicating a possible corruption of the text (on either side). The Peshitta has "the one to whom [it] belongs" Similarly, the Septuagint translates the word to "the things stored up for him".

Some English translations retain the word "Shiloh", either as a title ("until Shiloh come," King James Version) or as a place name ("as long as men come to Shiloh," JPS Tanakh). Other translations render the whole phrase in English, yielding "until he comes to whom it belongs" (Revised Standard Version), "until tribute comes to him" (English Standard Version) or "until He whose right it is comes" (Holman Christian Standard Bible).

Interpretation

The reference to sceptre and the Tribe of Judah has led many people to view this verse as a Messianic prophecy.  mentions the lion of Judah that also is recalled in the Latin Exorcism against Satan and the apostate angels. In the exorcism, Jesus the Lord is prayed as follows: "Vícit Leo de tríbu Júda, rádix Dávid" (The Lion of the tribe of Judah, the root of David hath conquered). The verse explains Genesis 49.9-10 while indicating Christ as the Good Shepherd, preceded by the sceptre of His ancestor king David and by the law-giver of Moses.

This interpretation goes back at least as far as the Targum Onkelos in the first century AD, and was indeed interpreted to be the promised Messiah in most traditional Jewish thoughts and writings.

Among Christians, "Shiloh" is seen as a reference to Jesus, whom they believe to have fulfilled the earlier prophecies of the Torah, although the word itself is not specifically mentioned in the New Testament, although some have connected it to the Pool of Siloam, referred to in the story of the healing of the man born blind. However, Genesis 49:10 became a major messianic text appealed to by the early Church Fathers. The Christian messianic interpretation is found in the capitalisation of the pronoun "He" in the Holman Christian Standard Bible ("until He whose right it is comes").

Some Christian scholars, however, have pointed out that the rendering of the text labors under the difficulty that Shiloh is not found as a personal name in the Old Testament. Other interpretations from analysts have translated the term to indicating "the name of a place, not a person", although they also conclude that this is less likely overall.

Latter Day Saint movement 
In the Church of Jesus Christ of Latter-day Saints and according Joseph Smith Jr. "Shiloh" is a name of the messiah Jesus Christ.

In one of the sacred books of the Church of Christ with the Elijah Message called The Word of the Lord or The Word of the Lord Brought to Mankind by an Angel God says that "Shiloh" is one of his names along with "Jehovah", "Jesus Christ" and others.

Islamic interpretation 

Al-Hakim bi-Amr Allah (985-1021), the fourth Fatimid Caliph and 16th Imam according to the Ismaili tradition, was held to be the Shiloh Messiah figure referred to in Genesis. Hamid al-Din al-Kirmani (d. 1026), as well as the various contemporary Ministers (Da'is) of al-Hakim who eventually founded the Druze community, propagated this view and denied that Jesus was the one concerned by the reference since Jesus was not a king (rejecting the His regal genealogy).

According to al-Samawal al-Maghribi in his Ifḥām al-Yahūd, the Shiloh mentioned in Genesis 49:10 is none other than Jesus the son of Mary.

Shiloh has been interpreted as referring to Muhammad with a special concern to Quran 3:81.

See also
 Messiah in Judaism
 Shiloh (biblical city)
 Tribe of Judah

References

Book of Genesis people
Hebrew words and phrases in the Hebrew Bible
Jacob
Jewish messianism